Beyond is a 2012 psychological thriller film starring Jon Voight, Teri Polo, and Dermot Mulroney. The film, directed by Josef Rusnak, was shot entirely on location in Anchorage, Alaska.

Plot
A detective searching for a missing child is approached by a radio psychic who claims to be able to see visions through the child's eyes.

Cast
 Jon Voight as Detective Jon Koski
 Teri Polo as Sarah Noble
 Ben Crowley as Jim Noble
 Chloe Lesslie as Amy Noble
 Dermot Mulroney as Officer Jack Musker
 Julian Morris as Farley Connors
 Skyler Shaye as Megan
 Brett Baker as Gavin

Release
The film was released directly to DVD in the UK on 30 Jan 2012, Germany on 30 Mar 2012, and the US on 22 May 2012.

Reception
Chris Holt of Starburst rated it 5/10 stars and wrote, "...no matter how entertaining it may be, nobody would ever be convinced it had a chance in cinemas".  Tyler Foster of DVD Talk rated it 2/5 stars and wrote, "Even though it doesn't make any serious mistakes or missteps, there's also nothing special about it; this is assembly-line entertainment to its very core."  Gordon Sullivan of DVD Verdict described it as "just another by-the-numbers thriller" but recommended it to fans of Voight.

References

External links
 
 

2012 films
2012 psychological thriller films
American thriller drama films
Films set in 1988
Films set in Alaska
Films shot in Alaska
Films scored by Mario Grigorov
2010s English-language films
Films directed by Josef Rusnak
2010s American films